Longue-Pointe was a Montreal neighbourhood now located in the borough of Mercier-Hochelaga-Maisonneuve. The neighborhood was permanently divided by the construction of the Louis-Hippolyte Lafontaine Tunnel. Most of its territory is now part of the Mercier-Ouest while some of the area that fell east of the highway is now within Mercier-Est.

It is best known for its military base, CFB Longue-Pointe, the supply depot for all of Eastern Canada's armed forces. Around 2000 civilians and soldiers work at CFB Longue Pointe.

Longue-Pointe was the site of a famous battle in the American Revolutionary War in 1775, in which Ethan Allen made an ill-fated attempt to capture Montreal from the Kingdom of Great Britain.

References

External links
Atelier d'histoire de la Longue-Pointe

Neighbourhoods in Montreal
Mercier–Hochelaga-Maisonneuve